Linolein is a triglyceride in which glycerol is esterified with linoleic acid. It's a primary constituent of sunflower oil and multiple other vegetable fats. It is used in the manufacturing of biodiesel. Linolein is also an ingredient in some cosmetic products.

See also
 Trimyristin

References

Triglycerides